Dragan Bogavac (Cyrillic: Драган Богавац; born 7 April 1980) is a retired Montenegrin professional footballer who played as a striker and winger.

Club career
Bogavac started his career in the Serbia and Montenegro lower leagues with Brskovo and later had three seasons with first league powerhouse Red Star Belgrade, before moving abroad to play in Germany and Kazakhstan.

International career
He made his debut for Serbia and Montenegro in an April 2002 friendly match against Lithuania, his sole game for that team. His debut for Montenegro came in a September 2007 friendly against Sweden and he earned a total of 7 caps, scoring no goals. His final international was a September 2008 World Cup qualification match against Bulgaria.

References

External links
 
 

1980 births
Living people
People from Bijelo Polje
Association football forwards
Serbia and Montenegro footballers
Serbia and Montenegro under-21 international footballers
Serbia and Montenegro international footballers
Montenegrin footballers
Montenegro international footballers
Dual internationalists (football)
FK Rudar Pljevlja players
Red Star Belgrade footballers
SV Wacker Burghausen players
TuS Koblenz players
SC Paderborn 07 players
1. FSV Mainz 05 players
FC Astana players
OFK Beograd players
Second League of Serbia and Montenegro players
First League of Serbia and Montenegro players
2. Bundesliga players
Bundesliga players
Kazakhstan Premier League players
Serbian SuperLiga players
Serbia and Montenegro expatriate footballers
Expatriate footballers in Germany
Serbia and Montenegro expatriate sportspeople in Germany
Montenegrin expatriate footballers
Montenegrin expatriate sportspeople in Germany
Expatriate footballers in Kazakhstan
Montenegrin expatriate sportspeople in Kazakhstan
Expatriate footballers in Serbia
Montenegrin expatriate sportspeople in Serbia